Hanif Kunrai (born 16 June 1994) is an Afghan cricketer. He made his first-class debut for Kunar Province in the 2018–19 Mirwais Nika Provincial 3-Day tournament on 15 February 2019, scoring 200 not out in the first innings.

References

External links
 

1994 births
Living people
Afghan cricketers
Place of birth missing (living people)